José Juan Bárcenas González (born 14 May 1961) is a Mexican politician affiliated with the National Action Party. As of 2014 he served as Deputy of the LIX Legislature of the Mexican Congress as a plurinominal representative.

References

1961 births
Living people
People from Tlaxcala
Members of the Chamber of Deputies (Mexico)
National Action Party (Mexico) politicians
Meritorious Autonomous University of Puebla alumni
Autonomous University of Tlaxcala alumni
21st-century Mexican politicians
Deputies of the LIX Legislature of Mexico